The 1938 Maine gubernatorial election took place on September 12, 1938. Incumbent Republican Governor Lewis O. Barrows defeated Democratic Party challenger (and former Governor) Louis J. Brann. Communist Party USA candidate Winfred V. Tabbutt received 325 votes.

Barrows' re-election coincided with a clean sweep by Maine Republicans.

Results

Gubernatorial
1938
Maine
September 1938 events